Najib Zerouali Ouariti (born 15 May 1950, Fes) is a Moroccan politician of the National Rally of Independents party. He held the position of Minister of the Modernization of the Public Sector in the cabinet of Driss Jettou, and Minister of Higher Education and Scientific Research in the cabinet of Abderrahmane Youssoufi. Since 10 January 2006, he is Ambassador of Morocco to Tunisia.

Zerouali Ouariti is a physician and a Surgeon. He was the Principal of the Medical school of Casablanca.

See also
Cabinet of Morocco

References

Government ministers of Morocco
1950 births
Living people
People from Fez, Morocco
Moroccan surgeons
Ambassadors of Morocco
Ambassadors of Morocco to Tunisia
Moroccan diplomats
National Rally of Independents politicians